GTPgammaS (GTPγS, guanosine 5'-O-[gamma-thio]triphosphate) is a non-hydrolyzable or slowly hydrolyzable G-protein-activating analog of guanosine triphosphate (GTP). Many GTP binding proteins demonstrate activity when bound to GTP, and are inactivated via the hydrolysis of the phosphoanhydride bond that links the γ-phosphate to the remainder of the nucleotide, leaving a bound guanosine diphosphate (GDP) and releasing an inorganic phosphate.  This usually occurs rapidly, and the GTP-binding protein can then only be activated by exchanging the GDP for a new GTP molecule.  The substitution of sulfur for one of the oxygens of the γ-phosphate of GTP creates a nucleotide that either cannot be hydrolyzed or is only slowly hydrolyzed.  This prevents the GTP-binding proteins from being inactivated, and allows the cellular processes that they carry out when active to be more easily studied.

The consequences of the constitutive activation of GTP-binding proteins include stimulation of phosphoinositide hydrolysis, cyclic AMP accumulation or elimination, and activation of specific proto-oncogenes. The 35S labelled radioligand of the compound, 35SGTPγS, is used in autoradiography and G-protein binding studies.

References

Nucleotides